Triston Gregory Chambers (born 25 December 1982) is an English footballer who played in the Football League as a forward for Colchester United.

Career

Born in Enfield, London, Chambers came through the youth ranks at Colchester United, signing a short-term professional contract with the club in the summer of 2001. He made his debut for Colchester coming on as a 70th-minute substitute for Mick Stockwell in a 1–0 defeat to Cardiff City on 6 April 2002. This was to be his only appearance for the club and his only appearance in the Football League.

In September 2002, Chambers joined Harlow Town on a month-long loan deal in an attempt to gain first-team experience after failing to break into the Colchester starting eleven. He made his debut in a 2–0 win over Thame United.

Chambers was released from his contract with Colchester in October 2002 following a breach of club rules, linking up with Dagenham & Redbridge on trial as he searched for a new club. He joined the Daggers permanently following his trial, and later made appearances for Heybridge Swifts.

References

1982 births
Living people
Footballers from Enfield, London
English footballers
Association football forwards
Colchester United F.C. players
Harlow Town F.C. players
Dagenham & Redbridge F.C. players
Heybridge Swifts F.C. players
English Football League players